Kubilay Kanatsızkuş (born 28 March 1997) is a Turkish footballer who plays as a forward for TFF First League club Çaykur Rizespor.

Professional career
A long-time youth product of Bursaspor, Kubilay made his first professional appearance in a 2-0 Süper Lig loss to Gençlerbirliği S.K. on 13 February 2016, at the age of 17.

On 31 August 2018 he has joined Ankaragücü with a one-year loan deal. After a half year on loan, his loan contract has been terminated and he returned to Bursaspor.

International career
He has represented the Turkish Football Federation at the U19 and U21 levels.

References

External links
 
 
 

1997 births
People from Osmangazi
Living people
Turkish footballers
Turkey youth international footballers
Turkey under-21 international footballers
Association football forwards
Bursaspor footballers
MKE Ankaragücü footballers
Yeni Malatyaspor footballers
Çaykur Rizespor footballers
Süper Lig players
TFF First League players